Stuart O'Grady  (born 6 August 1973) is a retired Australian professional road bicycle racer, who rode as a professional between 1995 and 2013. A former track cyclist, O'Grady and Graeme Brown won a gold medal in the Men's Madison at the 2004 Summer Olympics. O'Grady also won Paris–Roubaix in 2007. O'Grady competed in the Tour de France from 1997 and contended for the points classification in the Tour de France known as the green jersey, finishing second in the 1998, 1999, 2001 and 2005 races. He wore the yellow jersey of general classification leader in 1998 and 2001.

With his participation in the 2013 Tour de France, he tied George Hincapie's record of 17 participations in the Tour de France. However, Hincapie was removed from three of his 17 starts for his part in the Lance Armstrong doping scandal, and O'Grady himself admitted having been assisted by illicit erythropoietin (EPO) use at least on the 1998 Tour de France (the Dutchman Joop Zoetemelk holds the absolute records of completed Tours de France, with 16 from 1970 to 1986). He was awarded the Order of Australia Medal. O'Grady is the current Race Director of the Tour Down Under.

Early life and amateur career
Stuart O'Grady was born in Adelaide and grew up as a part of a cycling family. His father represented South Australia in road and track cycling, and his uncle, Robert Baird, is a former Australian cyclist who competed in the men's team pursuit at the 1964 Summer Olympics.

As a student, he attended St Paul's College. At this time, he started in track cycling and won a silver medal in the 4000m team pursuit at the 1992 Summer Olympics in Barcelona at age 18. In the 1996 Summer Olympics in Atlanta, he won bronze medals in both the points race and team pursuit. He was an Australian Institute of Sport scholarship holder.

Professional career
He joined the  professional team, which included English time trial specialist Chris Boardman. This team became known as Crédit Agricole from 1999.

In the 1998 Tour de France, a race for which he confirmed to doping himself with illicit and proscribed erythropoietin, he wore the yellow jersey for three days. He also won his first stage. In 2001 he wore the yellow jersey for six days. He was Australian Cyclist of the Year and Australian Male Road Cyclist of the Year in 1998 and 2001. In 1998 he finished second in the green jersey classification. In 2001, O'Grady had been in contention for the green jersey with Erik Zabel but he was defeated on the final day.

In 2001, he had a narrowing in the iliac artery. Tests showed his right leg produced more power than his left. After surgery in April 2002, he was again in contention in the 2002 Tour de France. In 2003 and 2004 he was overshadowed in the green jersey competition by fellow Australian sprinters Baden Cooke (2003) and Robbie McEwen (2004). O'Grady still managed to win his second Tour de France stage, in 2004.

After a start fraught with injuries and doping allegations in his team, he won two stages and the points classification in the Critérium du Dauphiné Libéré. He won a stage in the 2004 Tour de France and spent a few days in the green jersey. He won the UCI Road World Cup race, HEW Cyclassics. He topped his victories by winning an Olympic gold medal in the madison cycling with Graeme Brown.

In the 2005 Tour de France, O'Grady came second in the green jersey classification to Thor Hushovd of Norway, followed by Robbie McEwen. He broke several ribs in an early season race in Italy and a vertebra in the Tour de France. O'Grady continued riding the Tour despite the pain, coming third in the final stage.

Early in 2007, O'Grady became the first Australian to win a major classic when he crossed the line first in Paris–Roubaix. He had a puncture midway but recovered to rejoin the field before arriving alone in the Roubaix Velodrome.

On 15 July 2007, O'Grady was forced to abandon on stage 8 of the 2007 Tour de France, from Le-Grand-Bornand to Tignes, after crashing on a descent, fracturing eight ribs, his right shoulder blade, right collar bone and three vertebrae, and puncturing his right lung.

O'Grady crashed  into the 2009 Milan–San Remo when another rider came down in front of him, he punctured his lung and suffered a broken right collar bone once again as well as a broken rib.

On 8 August 2011, O'Grady announced that he had joined the new Australian team  for 2012. He announced his retirement from professional cycling as a competitive rider on 23 July 2013, following the conclusion of the 2013 Tour de France.

Doping
On 24 July 2013, O'Grady was named in the French Senate report detailing EPO use in the 1998 Tour de France as having returned a sample suspicious for EPO use. He confirmed the same day in an interview with an Australian newspaper that he had taken EPO prior to the 1998 Tour de France, but stated that the arrests around that Tour scared him off doping in the rest of his career.

This announcement has created some controversy amongst cycling fans, as O'Grady had been a vocal critic of the doping culture that existed in the late 1990s and early 2000s. As a result of his doping admission, the Australian Institute of Sport indefinitely suspended O'Grady from its 'Best of the Best'. O'Grady had been inducted in 2006.

Personal life
O'Grady set up and financially supports an Australian junior cycling development team, CSC Team O'Grady, which was established in 2005.

O'Grady is today a member of the 'Champions for Peace' club, a group of 54 famous elite athletes committed to serving peace in the world through sport, created by Peace and Sport, a Monaco-based international organisation.

O'Grady supports the Port Adelaide Power in the Australian Football League.

The Stuart O'Grady Bikeway adjacent to the Northern Expressway in the northern suburbs of Adelaide is named after O'Grady.

Major results

1992
 2nd  Team pursuit, Olympic Games
1993
 1st  Team pursuit, UCI Track World Championships
1994
 Commonwealth Games
1st  Team pursuit
1st  Scratch race
2nd  Points race
3rd  Individual pursuit
1995
 1st  Team pursuit, UCI Track World Championships
1996
 1st Stage 3 Vuelta a Murcia
 Olympic Games
3rd  Team pursuit
3rd  Points race
1997
 Herald Sun Tour
1st Stages 1, 6 & 8
 1st Stage 5 Bayern Rundfahrt
 1st  Points classification Setmana Catalana de Ciclisme
 7th Gent–Wevelgem
1998
 1st  Overall PruTour
1st Stages 2 & 7
 Tour de FranceAssisted by illicit erythropoeitin use 
1st Stage 14
Held  after Stages 4–6
 1st Stage 2 Tour de Luxembourg
 1st Stage 5 Tour du Poitou-Charentes
 2nd  Time trial, Commonwealth Games
 2nd GP Haribo
1999
 1st  Overall Tour Down Under
1st Stages 3 & 5
 1st Haribo Classic
 1st Stage 5 PruTour
2000
 1st Stage 3 GP du Midi-Libre
2001
 1st  Overall Tour Down Under
 1st Gouden Pijl Emmen
 Tour de France
1st Stage 5 (TTT)
Held  after Stages 3–6 & 8–9
2002
 Commonwealth Games
1st  Road race
2003
 1st  Road race, National Road Championships
 Tour de Langkawi
1st Stages 6 & 8
 1st Centenaire classification Tour de France
 3rd Overall Danmark Rundt
 3rd Tour of Flanders
 3rd Paris–Tours
2004
 1st  Madison, Olympic Games
 Critérium du Dauphiné Libéré
1st Stages 5 & 7
 1st HEW Cyclassics
 1st Grand Prix de Villers-Cotterêts
 1st Stage 5 Tour de France
 1st Stage 1 Post Danmark Rundt
 1st Wiener Radfest
 3rd Milan–San Remo
2005
 2nd Overall Volta ao Algarve
 3rd Overall Tour Down Under
 4th Milan–San Remo
 6th Rund um Köln
 10th Gent–Wevelgem
2006
 1st Stage 1 (TTT) Vuelta a España
 2nd Overall Tour of Denmark
1st  Points classification
 2nd Züri-Metzgete
 3rd Paris–Tours
2007
 1st Paris–Roubaix
 3rd Dwars door Vlaanderen
 4th Milano–Torino
 5th Milan–San Remo
 5th Overall Tour of California
 5th Omloop Het Volk
 9th E3 Prijs Vlaanderen
 10th Tour of Flanders
2008
 1st  Overall Herald Sun Tour
1st Stages 2 & 5
 5th Paris–Roubaix
 8th Gent–Wevelgem
2009
 2nd Overall Tour Down Under
2010
 7th Mumbai Cyclothon
 10th Overall Tour of Qatar
2011
 1st Stage 1 (TTT) Vuelta a España
 8th Paris–Tours
 9th E3 Prijs Vlaanderen
 10th Milan–San Remo
2012
 1st Stage 1 (TTT) Tirreno–Adriatico
 6th Road race, Olympic Games
2013
 1st Stage 4 (TTT) Tour de France

Grand Tour general classification results timeline

See also
List of Australians who have led the Tour de France general classification
List of athletes with the most appearances at Olympic Games

References

External links

1973 births
Australian Institute of Sport cyclists
Australian male cyclists
Australian Tour de France stage winners
Commonwealth Games gold medallists for Australia
Commonwealth Games silver medallists for Australia
Commonwealth Games bronze medallists for Australia
Cyclists at the 1994 Commonwealth Games
Cyclists at the 1998 Commonwealth Games
Cyclists at the 2002 Commonwealth Games
Cyclists at the 1992 Summer Olympics
Cyclists at the 1996 Summer Olympics
Cyclists at the 2000 Summer Olympics
Cyclists at the 2004 Summer Olympics
Cyclists at the 2008 Summer Olympics
Cyclists at the 2012 Summer Olympics
Living people
Olympic cyclists of Australia
Olympic gold medalists for Australia
Olympic silver medalists for Australia
Olympic bronze medalists for Australia
Olympic medalists in cycling
Recipients of the Medal of the Order of Australia
Cyclists from Adelaide
Doping cases in cycling
Doping cases in Australian cycling
UCI Track Cycling World Champions (men)
Medalists at the 1992 Summer Olympics
Medalists at the 1996 Summer Olympics
Medalists at the 2004 Summer Olympics
Commonwealth Games medallists in cycling
Australian track cyclists
Medallists at the 1994 Commonwealth Games
Medallists at the 1998 Commonwealth Games
Medallists at the 2002 Commonwealth Games